Satansarı is a village in the Ortaköy District, Aksaray Province, Turkey. Its population is 385 (2021).

References

Villages in Ortaköy District, Aksaray